The 1918 New Hampshire football team was an American football team slated to represent New Hampshire College of Agriculture and the Mechanic Arts during the 1918 college football season—the school became the University of New Hampshire in 1923. However, due to World War I, the varsity season was cancelled. The school did field a team composed of Student Army Training Corps (SATC) personnel, which played a five-game schedule.

Varsity
New Hampshire's varsity team had an eight-game schedule planned, which was released in March 1918. None of the games were played, and by mid-October the season was abandoned, as head coach William "Butch" Cowell was commissioned in the United States Army; he would be discharged in December 1918. The team would have been captained by E. Dewey Graham; he would later captain the 1919 varsity team.

SATC
By early November, the Student Army Training Corps (SATC) had selected a 35-man roster and was holding practices. The team was coached by Edson D. "Chuck" Sanborn, who had been captain of New Hampshire's 1908 team. Five games with other teams were organized, most being played after the Armistice with Germany.

These games do not appear in New Hampshire's media guide, as this was not a varsity team.

Notes

References

New Hampshire
New Hampshire Wildcats football seasons
New Hampshire football